The Calumet Plantation House, in St. Mary Parish, Louisiana near Patterson, Louisiana, was built around 1830, modified c.1850-70, and further modified around 1950.  It was added to the National Register of Historic Places in 1984.

The house was deemed architecturally significant "as an example of a very successful conversion and major enlargement of an early nineteenth century 'cottage' sized house into a mid-nineteenth century large 'plantation house.'"

See also 

 National Register of Historic Places listings in St. Mary Parish, Louisiana

References

Houses on the National Register of Historic Places in Louisiana
Houses completed in 1830
Houses in St. Mary Parish, Louisiana
1830 establishments in Louisiana
National Register of Historic Places in St. Mary Parish, Louisiana
Plantations in Louisiana